Stephanie of Lampron (ca. 1220/1225 – soon after April 1, 1249, buried at Santa Sophia, Nicosia), was a queen consort of Cyprus, wife of Henry I de Lusignan, king of Cyprus. 

She was the daughter of Constantine, lord of Lampron and Regent of Armenia, and Stephanie of Barbaron. She was the sister of Sempad the Constable. She married at Nicosia in 1237/1238, without issue.

References

Cypriot queens consort
1220s births
1249 deaths
13th-century Cypriot people